The 1996 United States presidential election in Texas took place on November 5, 1996. All fifty states, and the District of Columbia, took part in the 1996 United States presidential election. State voters chose 32 electors to the Electoral College, which selected the president and vice president.

Texas was won by Kansas Senator Bob Dole, who was running against incumbent President Bill Clinton of Arkansas. Clinton ran a second time with incumbent Vice President Al Gore as his running mate, and Dole ran with former New York Representative Jack Kemp. Texas provided both two of the nation's three most Republican counties – High Plains-based Ochiltree in its north and Glasscock in the central plains – and its most Democratic county in rock-ribbed Tejano Starr County at the opposite end of the state.

Texas weighed in for this election as 13% more Republican than the national average. With its 32 electoral votes, Texas was Dole's biggest electoral college prize, If Clinton had won the state, then he would have won over 400 electoral votes with it being 411. The presidential election of 1996 was a very multi-partisan election for Texas, with more than 7% of the electorate voting for third-party candidates. In his second bid for the presidency, Ross Perot led the newly reformed Reform Party to gain over 6% of the votes in his home state of Texas, and to pull in support nationally as the most popular third-party candidate to run for United States presidency in recent times. Loving County, Texas was one of two counties nationwide in which Ross Perot came in second place, ahead of one of the two major-party nominees, in 1996, the other being Arthur County, Nebraska.

Thanks to the political realignment of rural America in the 21st century, and aided by Texas Governor George W. Bush being the Republican nominee in the 2000 and 2004 presidential elections, the state's rural areas--particularly traditional Democratic strongholds like East Texas--grew dramatically more Republican after this election. Primarily due to Clinton's rural appeal, this was the last election where rural Texas played a factor in the close margin, as almost all of these counties switched from Democrat to Republican beginning in 2000.

, this is the last time a Democratic presidential candidate won the following counties: Hudspeth, Pecos, Terrell, Ward, Swisher, Hall, Cottle, Hardeman, Foard, Baylor, Knox, Haskell, Stonewall, Kent, Dickens, Crosby, Jones, Fisher, Nolan, Mitchell, Menard, Comanche, Palo Pinto, Bastrop, Caldwell, Nueces, San Patricio, Refugio, Bee, Karnes, Atascosa, Burleson, Milam, Falls, Limestone, Navarro, Waller, Grimes, Galveston, Trinity, Orange, Jasper, Tyler, Sabine, San Augustine, Shelby, Panola, Harrison, Marion, Cass, Bowie, Camp, Titus, Red River, Rains, Hopkins, Delta, and Fannin. The 58 counties who have not voted for a Democrat since 1996 are the most from one state in this election -- an election already defined by being the end of white rural Southern support for the Democrats writ large -- and the most from one state since 1976 (also Texas, with 73). This would also be the last election until 2016 in which the margin of victory for a Republican in Texas would be in the single digits, and the most recent one when the Republican candidate's vote percentage was held to only a plurality. This is also the last time a Democrat won a county in the Texas Panhandle.

Results

Results by county

See also
 United States presidential elections in Texas
 Presidency of Bill Clinton

Notes

References

Texas
1996
1996 Texas elections